Guirlain Désiré Wato Kuaté (born 19 September 1995) is a professional footballer who plays as a defensive midfielder for Italian Serie D club Atletico Uri.

Kuaté was born in Douala, Cameroon, and also holds Portuguese nationality. During his career he has had short stints with Akhisar Belediyespor, Asteras Tripoli, Dundee United, Liga Leumit side Hapoel Petah Tikva, Rovaniemen Palloseura, and Serie C side Bisceglie.

Career
Kuaté began his youth football career in Portugal with U.D. Leiria before joining AC Bellinzona in Switzerland. A successful trial led to him joining the Manchester City Academy in 2012. While in England, Kuaté was also on trial with Barnsley in 2013.

Kuaté signed for Akhisar Belediyespor in the Turkish Süper Lig during the January 2014 transfer window, after being released by Manchester City. He made his professional debut for Akhisar on 8 March 2014 in a 6–1 defeat against Galatasaray.
 
The following year, Kuaté signed a four-year contract with Super League Greece club Asteras Tripoli for an undisclosed fee. He made just one appearance for the club in the Greek Cup, although he was loaned to third-tier Greek Football League club Trikala for six months where he made just four league appearances before returning to Asteras.

Kuaté then signed a short-term contract with Scottish Championship club Dundee United in March 2017. He scored his first goal for the club in a Scottish Premiership promotion play-off match against Greenock Morton on 12 May 2017. During a subsequent play-off match against Hamilton Academical, Kuaté had an on-field physical altercation with teammate Mark Durnan, then reacted angrily to being substituted – storming off the field while making gestures towards, and sarcastically applauding, the home support. Dundee United manager Ray McKinnon publicly stated that Kuaté would not play for the club again, and Kuaté was subsequently released at the end of his contract.

On 18 October 2017, Kuaté signed with Liga Leumit side Hapoel Petah Tikva, but only made 5 appearances for the club.

Kuaté then transferred to Finnish Veikkausliiga club Rovaniemen Palloseura signing a one-year contract in March 2018. Kuaté made 17 league appearances for the club, scoring one goal, but his contract was terminated just four months later. RoPS Rovaniemi head coach Toni Koskela cited Kuaté's on-field disobedience along with his belief that he was bigger than the rest of the team.

In October 2018, Kuaté signed with Serie C side Bisceglie. However, he never played a match for the club and was released in December 2018.

On 10 December 2019, Kuaté returned to RoPS on a two-year contract. He only represented the club on pre-season friendlies and cup fixtures as the corona outbreak delayed the start of the season. The club terminated the contract on 26 June before the start of the season citing lack of commitment as the reason.

In October 2021, Kuaté signed with Polish club Górnik Mysłowice. He left in the summer 2022. In February 2023, he signed with Italian Serie D side Atletico Uri.

Career statistics

References

External links

1995 births
Living people
Footballers from Douala
Cameroonian footballers
Portuguese footballers
Association football midfielders
Akhisarspor footballers
Asteras Tripolis F.C. players
Dundee United F.C. players
Hapoel Petah Tikva F.C. players
Trikala F.C. players
Rovaniemen Palloseura players
Süper Lig players
Scottish Professional Football League players
Liga Leumit players
Football League (Greece) players
Veikkausliiga players
Expatriate footballers in Turkey
Expatriate footballers in Greece
Expatriate footballers in Scotland
Expatriate footballers in Israel
Expatriate footballers in Finland
Expatriate footballers in Poland
Expatriate footballers in Italy
Cameroonian expatriate footballers
Cameroonian expatriate sportspeople in Turkey
Cameroonian expatriate sportspeople in Greece
Cameroonian expatriate sportspeople in Scotland
Cameroonian expatriate sportspeople in Israel
Cameroonian expatriate sportspeople in Finland
Cameroonian expatriate sportspeople in Poland
Cameroonian expatriate sportspeople in Italy
Portuguese expatriate footballers
Portuguese expatriate sportspeople in Turkey
Portuguese expatriate sportspeople in Greece
Portuguese expatriate sportspeople in Scotland
Portuguese expatriate sportspeople in Israel
Portuguese expatriate sportspeople in Finland
Portuguese expatriate sportspeople in Poland
Portuguese expatriate sportspeople in Italy